She Married for Love is a 1914 American silent comedy film featuring Oliver Hardy.

Plot

Cast
 Pasqualina DeVoe - Mrs. Muggs
 Eva Bell - Rose Muggs
 Raymond McKee - Harry Bounce
 Harry Lorraine - The Deacon
 Mae Sheppard - The Old Maid
 Oliver Hardy - An Onlooker (as Babe Hardy)

See also
 List of American films of 1914
 Oliver Hardy filmography

External links

1914 films
American silent short films
American black-and-white films
1914 comedy films
1914 short films
Films directed by Arthur Hotaling
Silent American comedy films
American comedy short films
1910s American films